Domuz Island , literally "Pig Island") is a Mediterranean island of Turkey. The island was popularly named after wild boars which were thought to live in the island.

Geography
Administratively, the island is a part of Fethiye ilçe (district) of Muğla Province. There are pine and olive trees on the island, and it is a popular spot for daily excursion tours in the gulf.

History
There are ruins, in and around the island. But the island now is uninhabited.  During the Ottoman era, the island was purchased by Abbas II of Egypt, an Ottoman viceroy of Egypt. During the Turkish Republic it was sold to Sedat Simavi a journalist and a businessman. Simavi was the owner of Hürriyet newspaper and the island was also called "Hürriyet Island".

References

External links
For images

Islands of Muğla Province
Fethiye District
Islands of Turkey
Mediterranean islands